Coleophora apicialbella is a moth of the family Coleophoridae. It is found in the United States, including Ohio, Cincinnati and Indiana.

The larvae feed on the leaves of Silene virginica. They create a tubular, trivalved silken case.

References

apicialbella
Moths described in 1920
Moths of North America